Paradichostathes curticornis is a species of beetle in the family Cerambycidae, and the only species in the genus Paradichostathes. It was described by Breuning in 1956.

References

Crossotini
Beetles described in 1956
Monotypic beetle genera